Youth Fight for Jobs (YFJ) is a campaigning youth organisation based across England, Scotland and Wales backed by 7 national British trade unions the PCS, RMT, the CWU, Unite, UCU, TSSA and BECTU as well as individual trade union branches, student unions and labour movement figures.

Foundation

Youth Fight for Jobs was launched through a 'March for Jobs', in the tradition of the Jarrow Marchers, to the G20 on 2 April. It held a foundation conference in May 2009.

Activities

Since its foundation, the organisation has been attempting to raise awareness of the issues surrounding youth unemployment and creating local groups to campaign for action on these issues.

On 28 November 2009, YFJ organised a national demonstration in London with over 1000 participants.

To mark the 75th anniversary of the Jarrow March on 1 October 2011, YFJ began a 330-mile march from Jarrow in South Tyneside to London to highlight youth unemployment., with the support of several MPs and the backing of eight national trade unions.

YFJ also marched from Merthyr Tydfil to Cardiff starting 4 August 2011 to highlight that Merthyr Tydfil had the fourth highest level of youth unemployment in Britain.

References

External links
 Youth Fight for Jobs national website
 Socialist Students national website

Unemployment in the United Kingdom
Youth empowerment organizations
Youth organisations based in the United Kingdom
Youth unemployment